Pinnower See is a lake in Mecklenburg-Vorpommern, Germany. At an elevation of 27.9 m, its surface area is 2.68 km².

External links 
 

Lakes of Mecklenburg-Western Pomerania